Manuel I (31 May 146913 December 1521), known as the Fortunate, was King of Portugal from 1495 to 1521. A member of the House of Aviz, Manuel was Duke of Beja and Viseu prior to succeeding his cousin, John II of Portugal, as monarch. Manuel ruled over a period of intensive expansion of the Portuguese Empire owing to the numerous Portuguese discoveries made during his reign. His sponsorship of Vasco da Gama led to the Portuguese discovery of the sea route to India in 1498, resulting in the creation of the Portuguese India Armadas, which guaranteed Portugal's monopoly on the spice trade. Manuel began the Portuguese colonization of the Americas and Portuguese India, and oversaw the establishment of a vast trade empire across Africa and Asia. He was also the first monarch to bear the title: By the Grace of God, King of Portugal and the Algarves, this side and beyond the Sea in Africa, Lord of Guinea and the Conquest, Navigation and Commerce in Ethiopia, Arabia, Persia and India (Portuguese: Pela Graça de Deus, Rei de Portugal e dos Algarves, d'Aquém e d'Além-Mar em África, Senhor da Guiné e da Conquista, Navegação e Comércio da Etiópia, Arábia, Pérsia e Índia).

Manuel established the Casa da Índia, a royal institution that managed Portugal's monopolies and its imperial expansion. He financed numerous famed Portuguese navigators, including Pedro Álvares Cabral (who discovered Brazil), Afonso de Albuquerque (who established Portuguese hegemony in the Indian Ocean), among numerous others. The income from Portuguese trade monopolies and colonized lands made Manuel the wealthiest monarch in Europe, allowing him to be one of the great patrons of the Portuguese Renaissance, which produced many significant artistic and literary achievements. Manuel patronized numerous Portuguese intellectuals, including playwright Gil Vicente (called the father of Portuguese and Spanish theatre). The Manueline style, considered Portugal's national architecture, is named for the king.

Early life

Manuel was born in Alcochete on 31 May 1469, the ninth child of Ferdinand, Duke of Viseu and Beatriz of Portugal. His father, Ferdinand, was the son of Edward, King of Portugal and the brother of Afonso V of Portugal, while his mother, Beatriz, was granddaughter of King John I of Portugal. In addition, his sister Eleanor of Viseu was the wife of King John II of Portugal.

Manuel grew up amidst conspiracies of the Portuguese noble families against King John II. In 1483, Fernando II, Duke of Braganza, leader of Portugal's most powerful feudal house, was executed for treason. Later, Manuel's older brother, Diogo, Duke of Viseu, was accused of leading a conspiracy against the crown and was stabbed to death in 1484 by the king himself.

Manuel thus would have had every reason to worry when he received a royal order in 1493 to present himself to the king, but his fears were groundless: John II wanted to name him heir to the throne after the death of his son Prince Afonso and the failed attempts to legitimise Jorge de Lencastre, Duke of Coimbra, his illegitimate son.  As a result of this stroke of luck, Manuel was nicknamed the Fortunate, and succeeded on John's death in 1495.

Reign

Imperial expansion

Manuel would prove a worthy successor to his cousin John II for his support of Portuguese exploration of the Atlantic Ocean and development of Portuguese commerce. During his reign, the following achievements were realized:

1498 – The discovery of a maritime route to India by Vasco da Gama. 
1500 – The discovery of Brazil by Pedro Álvares Cabral.
1501 – The discovery of Labrador by Gaspar and Miguel Corte-Real.
1503 - The construction of the first feitoria in Brazil by Fernão de Loronha and of a fort in the allied Kingdom of Cochin in India by Afonso de Albuquerque.
1505 – The construction of forts at Kilwa, Sofala, Angediva, and Cannanore by Francisco de Almeida as the first viceroy of India.
1506 - The capture of Essaouira in Morocco by Diogo de Azambuja.
1507 - The capture of Socotra by Tristão da Cunha and Oman by Afonso de Albuquerque.
1508 - The capture of Safi in Morocco by Diogo de Azambuja.
1510 - The capture of Goa in India by Afonso de Albuquerque.
1511 - The capture of Malacca in Malaysia by Afonso de Albuquerque.
1513 - The capture of Azamor in Morocco by Dom Jaime Duke of Braganza.
1515 - The capture of Ormus in the Persian Gulf by Afonso de Albuquerque.

The capture of Malacca in modern-day Malaysia in 1511 was the result of a plan by Manuel I to thwart the Muslim trade in the Indian Ocean by capturing Aden, blocking trade through Alexandria, capturing Ormuz to block trade through the Persian Gulf and Beirut, and capturing Malacca to control trade with China.

All these events made Portugal wealthy from foreign trade as it formally established a vast overseas empire. Manuel used the wealth to build a number of royal buildings (in the "Manueline" style) and to attract scientists and artists to his court.

Commercial treaties and diplomatic alliances were forged with the Ming dynasty of China and the Persian Safavid dynasty. Pope Leo X received a monumental embassy from Portugal during his reign designed to draw attention to Portugal's newly acquired riches to all of Europe.

Judicial reform
In Manuel's reign, royal absolutism was the method of government. The Portuguese Cortes (the assembly of the kingdom) met only three times during his reign, always in Lisbon, the king's seat.
He reformed the courts of justice and the municipal charters with the crown, modernizing taxes and the concepts of tributes and rights. During his reign, the laws in force in the kingdom of Portugal were recodified with the publication of the Manueline Ordinances.

Religious policy

Manuel was a very religious man and invested a large amount of Portuguese income to send missionaries to the new colonies, among them Francisco Álvares, and sponsor the construction of religious buildings, such as the Monastery of Jerónimos. Manuel also endeavoured to promote another crusade against the Turks.

His relationship with the Portuguese Jews started out well: At the outset of his reign, he released all the Jews who had been made captive during the reign of John II. Unfortunately for the Jews, he decided that he wanted to marry Infanta Isabella of Aragon, then heiress of the future united crown of Spain (and widow of his nephew Prince Afonso). Her parents Ferdinand and Isabella had expelled the Jews in 1492 and would not marry their daughter to the king of a country that still tolerated their presence. In the marriage contract, Manuel I agreed to persecute the Jews of Portugal.

In December 1496, it was decreed that all Jews either convert to Christianity or leave the country without their children. However, those expelled could only leave the country in ships specified by the king. When those who chose expulsion arrived at the port in Lisbon, they were met by clerics and soldiers who tried to use coercion and promises in order to baptize them and prevent them from leaving the country.

This period of time technically ended the presence of Jews in Portugal. Afterwards, all converted Jews and their descendants would be referred to as "New Christians", and they were given a grace period of thirty years in which no inquiries into their faith would be allowed; this was later extended to end in 1534.

During the Lisbon massacre of 1506, people murdered thousands of accused Jews; the leaders of the riot were executed by Manuel.

In addition, Manuel also ordered the expulsion of Muslims from Portugal, and is known to have pressured Ferdinand and Isabella of Spain to end the toleration of Islam in their own kingdom.

Family
Isabella died in childbirth in 1498, thus putting a damper on Portuguese ambitions to rule in Spain, which various rulers had harbored since the reign of King Ferdinand I (1367–1383). Manuel and Isabella's young son, Miguel da Paz, was named Prince of Asturias, Prince of Portugal, and Prince of Girona, making him heir apparent of Castile, Portugal, and Aragon until his death in 1500, at the age of two years, ended the ambitions of the Catholic Monarchs and Manuel.

Manuel's next wife, Maria of Aragon, was his first wife's younger sister. Two of their sons later became kings of Portugal. Maria died in 1517 but the two sisters were survived by two other sisters, Joanna of Castile, who was born in 1479 and had married the Archduke Philip (Maximilian I's son) and had a son, Charles V who would eventually inherit Spain and the Habsburg possessions, and Catherine of Aragon, first wife of Henry VIII and mother of the Queen Mary I.

Honours

Manuel I was awarded the Golden Rose by Pope Julius II in 1506 and by Pope Leo X in 1514. Manuel I became the first individual to receive more than one Golden Rose after Emperor Sigismund von Luxembourg.

Death

In December 1521, while Lisbon was dealing with an outbreak of the Black Plague, Manuel and his court were quarantined inside Ribeira Palace. On 4 December, Manuel began displaying symptoms of an intense fever which incapacitated him by the 11th. He died on 13 December 1521, at the age of 52, and was succeeded by his son, John III of Portugal.

The next day, his body was transported to the Belém district of Lisbon, in a black velvet-draped coffin, followed by masses of mourners. He was provisionally buried at Restelo Church, while the royal pantheon of the House of Aviz was furnished inside Jerónimos Monastery. His coffin was buried by four of the most prominent nobles of the kingdom, the Duke of Braganza, the Duke of Coimbra, and the Marquis of Vila Real, in a private ceremony attended only by the royal family and the Portuguese nobility. His remains were transferred to Jerónimos Monastery in 1551, along with his second wife Maria of Aragon.

Genealogy

Ancestry

Marriages and Issue

Manuel was married three times, and had two daughters and one granddaughter of Ferdinand and Isabella of Spain:
 Isabella, married from 20 September 1497 – 23 August 1498, died in childbirth
 Maria, married from 30 October 1500 – 7 March 1517, died from complications of pregnancy
 Eleanor, married from 16 July 1518 – 13 December 1521, outlived Manuel, later Queen Consort of France.

See also

 Manueline, an architectural style named after Manuel
 Portugal in the Age of Discovery
 Português
 Royal Palace of Évora

Notes

References

Bibliography

External links

|-

|-

1469 births
1521 deaths
House of Aviz
Knights of the Garter
Knights of the Golden Fleece
Maritime history of Portugal
Princes of Portugal
Portuguese infantes
104
People from Alcochete
Donatários of the Azores
15th-century Portuguese monarchs
16th-century Portuguese monarchs
Portuguese exploration in the Age of Discovery